Jang Eun-Jin (born 1976) is a female South Korean writer.

Life

Jang Eun-Jin was born in 1976 in Gwangju City, Jeollanamdo, South Korea. She has a twin sister, Kim Hee-jin. Jang attended Cheonam National University in Gwangju from which she graduated with a degree in Geography.  In 2004, Jang won the Jooggang Daily New Writers Award for her debut  titled Kitchen Laboratory, which was eventually published as a book in 2008.

Work

Jang has published four novels and a collection of short stories  and has won three literary prizes in total The Chonnam Ilbo New Short Story Award in 2002, the Joongang Ilbo New Writers Contest in 2004, and the 14th annual Munhakdongne Award in 2009.

Jang has had one book translated into English, No One Writes Back (Translated by Jung Yewon), which The Guardian reviewed as, “An extraordinarily rich and moving novel about a young man's journey through South Korea with his dog”  Her subject is communication, or its absence, and the book is written as a picaresque. It is the story of a young man, MP3 player and blind dog, and their three-year goal-less journey, and who they meet on that journey. The fellow travelers are anonymous, earning numbers in replacement for names, but the narrator nonetheless writes them letters, in the hope that someday a letter will come back.

Selected works

Works in translation
 No One Writes Back

Works in Korean (partial)
 날짜없음 
 빈집을 두드리다
 그녀의 집은 어디인가 (Where is that Woman's House?)
 아무도 편지하지 않다 (No One Writes Back)
 앨리스의 생활 방식 (How Alice Lives)
 키친 실험실 (Kitchen Laboratories: Short Stories)

Awards
 The Chonnam Ilbo New Short Story Award in 2002
 Joongang Ilbo New Writers Contest in 2004
14th annual Munhakdongne Award in 2009

References 

1976 births
Living people
People from Gwangju
South Korean novelists
South Korean women novelists